is a Japanese badminton player from Aizuwakamatsu, Fukushima Prefecture, Japan. She is affiliate with Tonami team.

Achievements

East Asian Games 
Women's singles

BWF World Junior Championships 
Girls' singles

Asian Junior Championships 
Girls' singles

BWF Grand Prix 
The BWF Grand Prix had two levels, the Grand Prix and Grand Prix Gold. It was a series of badminton tournaments sanctioned by the Badminton World Federation (BWF) and played between 2007 and 2017.

Women's singles

  BWF Grand Prix Gold tournament
  BWF Grand Prix tournament

BWF International Challenge/Series 
Women's singles

  BWF International Challenge tournament
  BWF International Series tournament

References

External links 
 

1996 births
Living people
Sportspeople from Fukushima Prefecture
Japanese female badminton players
Badminton players at the 2018 Asian Games
Asian Games gold medalists for Japan
Asian Games medalists in badminton
Medalists at the 2018 Asian Games
21st-century Japanese women